Golovinsky (masculine), Golovinskaya (feminine), or Golovinskoye (neuter) is the name of several rural localities in Russia.

Modern localities

Arkhangelsk Oblast
As of 2014, three rural localities in Arkhangelsk Oblast bear this name:

Golovinskaya, Konoshsky District, Arkhangelsk Oblast, a village in Vadyinsky Selsoviet of Konoshsky District; 
Golovinskaya, Velsky District, Arkhangelsk Oblast, a village in Puysky Selsoviet of Velsky District; 
Golovinskaya, Verkhnetoyemsky District, Arkhangelsk Oblast, a village in Fedkovsky Selsoviet of Verkhnetoyemsky District;

Irkutsk Oblast
As of 2014, one rural locality in Irkutsk Oblast bears this name:

Golovinskoye, Irkutsk Oblast, a selo in Alarsky District;

Ivanovo Oblast
As of 2014, one rural locality in Ivanovo Oblast bears this name:

Golovinskaya, Ivanovo Oblast, a village in Kineshemsky District;

Kostroma Oblast
As of 2014, two rural localities in Kostroma Oblast bear this name:

Golovinskoye, Severnoye Settlement, Susaninsky District, Kostroma Oblast, a village in Severnoye Settlement of Susaninsky District; 
Golovinskoye, Sokirinskoye Settlement, Susaninsky District, Kostroma Oblast, a selo in Sokirinskoye Settlement of Susaninsky District;

Tula Oblast
As of 2014, one rural locality in Tula Oblast bears this name:
Golovinskoye, Tula Oblast, a village in Stoyanovskaya Rural Administration of Odoyevsky District

Vologda Oblast
As of 2014, three rural localities in Vologda Oblast bear this name:
Golovinskoye, Vologda Oblast, a village in Sidorovsky Selsoviet of Gryazovetsky District
Golovinskaya, Kharovsky District, Vologda Oblast, a village in Kharovsky Selsoviet of Kharovsky District
Golovinskaya, Vozhegodsky District, Vologda Oblast, a village in Maryinsky Selsoviet of Vozhegodsky District

Yaroslavl Oblast
As of 2014, five rural localities in Yaroslavl Oblast bear this name:
Golovinskoye, Bolsheselsky District, Yaroslavl Oblast, a village in Chudinovsky Rural Okrug of Bolsheselsky District
Golovinskoye, Pereslavsky District, Yaroslavl Oblast, a village in Andrianovsky Rural Okrug of Pereslavsky District
Golovinskoye, Rostovsky District, Yaroslavl Oblast, a village in Novo-Nikolsky Rural Okrug of Rostovsky District
Golovinskoye, Levtsovsky Rural Okrug, Yaroslavsky District, Yaroslavl Oblast, a village in Levtsovsky Rural Okrug of Yaroslavsky District
Golovinskoye, Pestretsovsky Rural Okrug, Yaroslavsky District, Yaroslavl Oblast, a village in Pestretsovsky Rural Okrug of Yaroslavsky District

Alternative names
Golovinsky, alternative name of Golovino, a village in Lyulpansky Rural Okrug of Medvedevsky District in the Mari El Republic; 
Golovinskaya, alternative name of Golovino, a village in Biserovsky Rural Okrug of Afanasyevsky District in Kirov Oblast; 
Golovinskoye, alternative name of Golovino, a village in Golovinskoye Settlement of Sharyinsky District in Kostroma Oblast; 
Golovinskoye, alternative name of Golovnoye, a selo in Nizhnegolovinsky Selsoviet of Lebyazhyevsky District in Kurgan Oblast;